Liolaemus somuncurae is a species of lizard in the family Iguanidae or the family Liolaemidae. The species is endemic to Argentina.

References

somuncurae
Lizards of South America
Reptiles of Argentina
Endemic fauna of Argentina
Reptiles described in 1981
Taxa named by José Miguel Alfredo María Cei